In 1320, the Turks of Menteshe launched an unsuccessful attempt to conquer the island of Rhodes from the Knights Hospitaller.

Background 
The collapse of Byzantine power in western Anatolia and the Aegean Sea in the late 13th century, as well as the disbandment of the Byzantine navy in 1284, created a power vacuum in the region, which was swiftly exploited by the Turkish beyliks and the ghazi raiders. Utilizing local Greek seamen, the Turks began to engage in piracy across the Aegean, targeting especially the numerous Latin island possessions. Turkish corsair activities were aided by the feuds between the two major Latin maritime states, Venice and Genoa. In 1304, the Turks of Menteshe (and later the Aydinids) captured the port town of Ephesus, and the islands of the eastern Aegean seemed about to fall to Turkish raiders. To forestall such a calamitous event, in the same year the Genoese occupied Chios, where Benedetto I Zaccaria established a minor principality, while in ca. 1308 the Knights Hospitaller occupied Rhodes. In 1319, the Hospitallers under Albert of Schwarzburg defeated an Aydinid fleet at Chios and captured the castle of Leros.

Defeat of the invasion fleet 
In 1320—although some sources put it in 1321 or 1322—Rhodes itself was targeted by the Turks of Menteshe, under . A large army was gathered for the purpose, with a fleet of some 80 ships to carry and protect it to the island. Orhan clearly planned to occupy and settle Rhodes, as he took with him many non-combatants, old men, women and children; before attacking Rhodes, he left them at the small island of Episkopi (Tilos). The Hospitallers urgently gathered what forces he could find, mustering four galleys and twenty smaller vessels, to which were joined six Genoese galleys that happened to be at Rhodes. The Hospitaller–Genoese fleet managed to destroy the Turkish invasion fleet, and then sailed to Episkopi, where the Christians slaughtered or enslaved the Turks left there, reportedly 5,000 or even 10,000 people.

The historian Mike Carr however points out that it is possible that this battle is the result of a confusion by medieval sources with the battle at Chios in 1319.

References

Sources

 
 
 
 
 

1320 in Europe
14th century in Greece
Conflicts in 1320
Menteshe
Rhodes 1319
Rhodes 1319
Rhodes
Medieval Aegean Sea
Rhodes under the Knights Hospitaller